Some other extinct butterflies are prehistoric. See prehistoric butterflies.

This is a list of recently extinct butterflies, their former ranges, and dates of extinction.

Extinct species

Nymphalidae
 Libythea cinyras (Mauritius, 1866)

Lycaenidae
 Mbashe River buff, Deloneura immaculata (South Africa)
 Morant's blue, Lepidochrysops hypopolia (South Africa, 1879)
 Xerces blue, Glaucopsyche xerces (United States, 1941)

Uraniidae
 Urania sloanus (Jamaica, c. 1894-1908)

Extinct subspecies

Hesperiidae
 Florida zestos skipper, Epargyreus zestos oberon (United States)
 Rockland Meske's skipper, Hesperia meskei pinocayo (United States)

Papilionidae
 Polydamas swallowtail, Battus polydamas antiquus (Antigua and Barbuda, 1770)
 Parnassius clodius strohbeeni (United States)
 Danish clouded Apollo, Parnassius mnemosyne bang-haasi (Denmark)
 Paradise birdwing, Ornithoptera paradisea paradisea Staudinger (Papua New Guinea)

Nymphalidae
 Unsilvered fritillary, Speyeria adiaste atossa (United States)

Lycaenidae
 British large copper, Lycaena dispar dispar (England, 1864)
 Scarce large blue, Phengaris teleius burdigalensis (France)
 Dutch Alcon blue, Phengaris alcon arenaria (Netherlands, 1979)

See also
 Prehistoric butterflies

References

Butterflies
Extinct butterflies
Extinct